Du Zhaocai (Chinese: 杜兆才; born on 1 March 1960), is a Chinese football administrator who is the current vice-president of the Chinese Football Association, and a member of the FIFA Council since his election on 7 April 2019.

He previously served as vice president of the Asian Football Confederation (AFC) and as deputy minister at General Administration of Sport of China since October 2018. He had also served as the vice president of the Chinese Olympic Committee, as a council member of the International Association of Athletics Federations, and has over 30 years of experience as a sports administrator.

In April 2022, Du was elected as the president of the East Asian Football Federation for a four-year term.

References

External links

1960 births
Living people